Phallomycetidae is a subclass of the class Agaricomycetes of fungi.

References

Agaricomycetes